League of Assassins is a fictional group of villains appearing in comic books published by DC Comics.

League of Assassins may also refer to:
 League of Assassins (Arrowverse), the Arrowverse version of the group
 "League of Assassins" (Arrow episode), an episode of Arrow